Schmidt's Girls College (SGC;) is an international German school for Christian and Muslim girls, located in East Jerusalem. It was founded in 1886 and approximately 500 pupils attend the school today. It also offers a Tawjihi program. Although it is owned and supported by the German Association of the Holy Land, it is currently in the care of the international convent of the Sisters of the Congregation of Jesus. Lessons are taught in German and the spoken language outside of class is English. The teaching staff is composed of both Arab and German teachers.

History

Ottoman period: "Old Hospice" building
In 1886 a school for Arab girls was established in the Mutasarrifate of Jerusalem, then part of the Ottoman Empire, in the newly built "Old Hospice", which it shared with a pilgrims hospice and a medical station, at what is today number 25 on Hillel Street, a street leading east towards the Jaffa Gate. The school and the medical station were under the care of a convent of the Catholic Sisters of Mercy of St. Borromeo. In 1890, the German Lazarist, Father  (1833-1907) took on the administrative role for the school, developing it until his fatal accident. The school takes its name from him. The pupils' numbers grew from 36 in 1890 to approximately 120 in 1914, and to 138 in 1915. The syllabus followed the learning plans of German state schools.

During Kaiser Wilhelm II's journey through Palestine, he also paid a visit to the Schmidt's Girls College. At a meeting with him, Wilhelm Schmidt suggested building a new bigger and more suitable accommodation for pilgrims. The kaiser had already supported the construction of the Lutheran Church of the Redeemer in the Old City and the establishment of the Abbey of the Dormition on Mount Zion. With his support, the German Association of the Holy Land acquired two parcels directly opposite the Damascus Gate in Jerusalem, where they built the Paulus-Haus. The pilgrims' hospice moved into the new building in 1908, where a teachers' seminary was also established. As a result, more teaching space became available in the old hospice.

At the start of the First World War, the school was initially closed, like all other international institutions, but it resumed activity at the start of 1915 due to the good relations between Germany and the Ottoman Empire. The only requirement was to include Turkish as a teaching language.

British period
After the capture of Jerusalem by the British forces in late 1917 the college closed down for three years. When it reopened, under the British Mandate of Palestine, English replaced German as the main teaching language. However, German was later used again. By adopting Palestinian learning plans, the pupils could receive Palestinian certificates of secondary education alongside their German ones, as well as take a teaching exam. Initially, the college taught 27 pupils split between two classes and a kindergarten group. Because of the small number of female pupils, boys were also accepted until 1930. By 1936 the student body had increased to 370.

German became an obligatory foreign language from the sixth grade onwards in the 1930s. A German division was composed of two classes of German students taught according to German syllabuses.

From 1925 on the German church and state increased its support for the college, however the college remained largely unaffected by the Nazi ideology after 1933.

At the start of the Second World War the German teachers were deported, including the head of the school, Sister Marina Kramm, who was replaced by the Arab Sister Elia Sa’ati. The German teaching staff returned in 1943 and the school remained active until the start of the Palestine War in May 1948.

Jordanian period: "Paulus-Haus"
The old hospice in Hillel Street, used as a school building, lay in the western, Israeli part of Jerusalem after the ceasefire agreement of 1949. However, the students mainly lived in East Jerusalem, then under Jordanian administration and had to cross the ceasefire line on their way to the college. As a result, the school was temporarily moved into the Paulus-Haus on 1 October 1950. The headmaster, Father Sonnen, was able to achieve the move quickly through the support of the Israeli authorities, enlisting the help over 60 vans for the transportation purposes. Three years later the school had approximately 400 students. (The Old Hospice buildings have since been housing the Jerusalem Italian Jews Association, with the Italian Synagogue and, since 1952, the Museum of Italian Jewish Art.)

The Paulus-Haus was not conceived as a boarding school and had to continue to serve as a hospice. In the 1950s several new buildings were constructed and in 1962 a new school site began to be built on land adjacent to the Paulus-Haus. Although it was completed on 14 May 1967, the Six-Day War began only a few days later, during which the new building suffered heavy external damage.

Israeli period: new building
In June 1967 Israel occupied East Jerusalem and the West Bank, where part of the students are coming from.

Academic overview
The abitur is recognized by the Palestinian education authorities and enables applying for higher education in Germany, Palestine and worldwide. Almost 100% of Schmidt's College students continue onto university. The Schmidt's Girls College is considered a prestigious institution and graduates are in demand by employers. The college is under the care of the convent of the sisters of the Congregation of Jesus (CJ), also known as the Mary Ward Sisters, amongst other organisations.

The college is a Catholic school following the Corpus Iuris Canonici (lit. "Body of Canon Law") and highlights the requirements of the Gravissimum educationis. Since its establishment, it has been following German traditions and has a close connection to the German educational environment. At the same time it is a school in a predominantly Muslim region. This is reflected in the student body composition of 80% Muslim and 20% Christian students, which is the opposite of the teaching staff composition.

Famous graduates 
 Karimeh Abbud (1893-1940), photographer

See also

 Education in the Ottoman Empire
 List of schools in the Ottoman Empire

References

Further reading
 Margret Greiner: "Miss, wie buchstabiert man Zukunft?" : als deutsche Lehrerin in Jerusalem. ["Miss, how do you spell 'future'?": about being a German teacher in Jerusalem], in German. München: Malik, 2003

External links

 Schmidt-Schule Jerusalem, official homepage in English and German
 "Lernen zwischen Mauern – Die "Schmidt-Girls"" (Archive). Federal Office of Administration. 3 November 2014.
 Schmidt's Girls College on the German Association of the Holy Land website
 Statement of the German Association of the Holy Land regarding the Father Schmitz Collection, the history of Schmitz's taxidermic collection. Accessed Feb 2021.

Schools in Jerusalem
High schools in Israel
International schools in Israel
Girls' schools in Asia
German international schools in Asia
1886 establishments in the Ottoman Empire
Educational institutions established in 1886